This article is about the particular significance of the year 1981 to Wales and its people.

Incumbents

Secretary of State for Wales – Nicholas Edwards
Archbishop of Wales – Gwilym Williams, Bishop of Bangor
Archdruid of the National Eisteddfod of Wales
Geraint (outgoing)
Jâms Nicholas (incoming)

Events
January - First phase of St. David's Shopping Centre, Cardiff, opens to the public.
26 March - Roy Jenkins co-founds the Social Democratic Party (UK) in London. Welsh Labour MPs defecting to the new party are: Tom Ellis (Wrexham), Ednyfed Hudson Davies (Caerphilly) and Jeffrey Thomas (Abertillery).
24 February - Buckingham Palace announces the engagement of the Prince of Wales to Lady Diana Spencer.
5 April - UK census: Results reveal that the percentage of Welsh language speakers has fallen to an all-time low of 18.9% of the Welsh population and Gwynedd is the only Welsh county with a Welsh-speaking majority.
11 June - Britain's first Urban Enterprise Zone is created in Lower Swansea Valley.
29 July - Wedding of the Prince of Wales and Lady Diana Spencer at St Paul's Cathedral in London.
November - Joan Ruddock becomes Chair of CND.
Independent film company Teliesyn begins producing programmes for S4C, BBC Wales and HTV.

Arts and literature
6 June - The Alarm play their first gig under their new name, at the Victoria Hotel, Prestatyn.
Theatre Wales is established.
Harry Secombe receives a knighthood.

Awards
National Eisteddfod of Wales (held in Machynlleth)
National Eisteddfod of Wales: Chair - John Gwilym Jones, "Y Frwydr"
National Eisteddfod of Wales: Crown - Siôn Aled, "Wynebau"
National Eisteddfod of Wales: Prose Medal - John Griffith Jones, "Cysgodion ar y Pared"

New books

English language
Clive Jenkins & Barrie Sherman - The Leisure Shock
Eiluned Lewis - The Old Home
Kenneth O. Morgan - Rebirth of a Nation: Wales 1880-1980
R. S. Thomas - Between Here and Now

Welsh language
Irma Chilton - Y Cwlwm Gwaed
Eigra Lewis Roberts - Merch yr oriau mawr

Drama
J. R. Evans - Brawd am Byth

Music
Dafydd Iwan - "Yma o Hyd"
Daniel Jones - Symphony no. 10
William Mathias - Let the people praise Thee, O God

Film

English-language films
The Mouse and the Woman, starring Huw Ceredig.
Dragonslayer, with exterior scenes filmed in Wales.

Welsh-language films

Broadcasting

English-language television
The Life and Times of David Lloyd George, written by Elaine Morgan and starring Philip Madoc

Welsh-language television
Croeso i S4C, presented by Owen Edwards

Sport
BBC Wales Sports Personality of the Year – John Toshack
Boxing - Neville Meade becomes British heavyweight champion.
Football - Neville Southall joins Everton F.C.

Births
12 January – Sarah Thomas, field-hockey player
13 March – Ryan Jones, rugby player
17 March - Leigh De-Vulgt, footballer
28 March – Gareth David-Lloyd, actor
6 April – Robert Earnshaw, footballer
23 May – Gwenno Saunders, singer
24 May – Darren Moss, footballer
25 May – Huw Stephens, radio and TV presenter
18 November – Sian Reese-Williams, actress
19 November – Mark Wallace, cricketer
16 December – Gareth Williams Scottish-Welsh footballer

Deaths
January - Leslie Jones, footballer, 69
March - Dai Francis, miners' leader
1 March - Dr Martyn Lloyd-Jones, theologian, 81
8 March - Nigel Birch, Baron Rhyl, politician, 74
3 April - Will Owen, miner and politician, 80
13 April - Gwyn Thomas, author, 67
15 May - J. E. Meredith, Presbyterian minister and writer, 76
16 June - Billy Hughes, footballer, 63
17 June - Ike Fowler, dual-code international rugby union player, 86
23 July - Goronwy Roberts, Baron Goronwy-Roberts, politician, 67
6 August - George Lewis, footballer, 67
18 September - Brinley Richards, poet, author and archdruid
30 September - Roy John, Wales and British Lions international rugby union player, 55
25 December - Tom Griffiths, Welsh international footballer, 75

See also
1981 in Northern Ireland

References

 
Wales
 Wales